Microland is an Indian technology company, headquartered in Bangalore. It was founded by Pradeep Kar. The company employs more than 4,500 workers across its offices in Asia, Australia, Europe, Middle East, and North America. The company's services include digital networks, digital infrastructure, digital application, digital workplace, IIoT services and cybersecurity.

History

1989 - 1997 
Microland was started in Bangalore, India in August 1989 with a key focus on hardware and networking. It was founded by Pradeep Kar as a network integration company, with initial funding coming from SBI Capital Markets. Microland signed an agreement with Novell to become one of the first companies to bring network education to India. In the years between 1993 and 1997, Microland assisted in the introduction of new technologies to the Indian market, namely, Compaq, Cisco, SynOptics, and Netscape. In 1997, Microland hosted Bill Gates at a forum called ‘The Enterprise Tomorrow, Today’.

1998 - 2001 
After the advent of the internet economy in 1998, Kar built several companies such as Planetasia.com, indya.com (which he sold to Rupert Murdoch's News Corporation), ITspace.com, media2india.net and Net Brahma Technologies.

2002 - 2013 
In 2005, the firm signed a five-year contract for remote IT infrastructure management services with UK-based company Serco. In August 2006, it received $11 million in the second round of funding. In early 2007 Microland inaugurated its first multi-network operations center facility housing six network operations center, six tech labs, four data centers and one penetration testing lab. In December 2007, it opening a global technology support center in Bangalore. In April 2007, it partnered with Microsoft to provide cloud solutions to large enterprises in India. In 2008, it added managed security assessment and ITSM consulting to its services. In 2011, the firm signed a $55 million multi-year contract with Serco Limited, UK to provide specialist support through an expanded team located in Birmingham, UK, and Bangalore, India. In 2012, the firm added virtualization & cloud infrastructure life cycle services (design, deploy & management of public, private & hybrid clouds including cloud integration & automation) to its portfolio and as part of this built partnerships with leading cloud technology providers.

2014 - 2017 
On 26 August 2014, Microland completed 25 years of operation and was recognized as the first Hybrid IT Infrastructure provider in India. On 2 December 2014, the firm partnered with Computacenter in opening the Global Network Operations Centre (GNOC) at Bagmane Tech Park, Bangalore. In 2015, Saudi Arabia's National Commercial Bank (NCB) selected Microland as its IT infrastructure services partner to manage its branch technology services across the kingdom. In 2016, it set up its first offshore delivery center for ASG group, Australia in Bagmane Tech Park, Bangalore. In 2017, Microland reinforced its digital focus with MicrolandOne, a digital app for its workforce. In line with its digital initiatives, it launched Digital hubs in Birmingham, UK and Pune, India.

2019 - present 
In January 2019, the company announced the appointment Srikara CR as Senior Vice President of Global Professional Services and Presales. In August 2019 they hired Ashish Mahadwar as President. In October 2019, the company announced the appointment of Anupam Pandey as Chief Information Officer.

Locations
Microland is headquartered in Ecospace, Bellandur, Bangalore, with seven other offices in India. It has client servicing and sales offices in Asia, Australia, Europe, Middle East and North America.

See also
 List of Indian IT companies

References 

Technology companies established in 1989
Outsourcing companies
International information technology consulting firms
Information technology companies of Bangalore
Indian companies established in 1989
Privately held companies of India
1989 establishments in Karnataka

External Links